Atterley is a village in Shropshire, England.

Villages in Shropshire
Much Wenlock